Austroblechnum is a genus of ferns in the family Blechnaceae, subfamily Blechnoideae, according to the Pteridophyte Phylogeny Group classification of 2016 (PPG I). The genus is accepted in a 2016 classification of the family Blechnaceae, but other sources sink it into a very broadly defined Blechnum, equivalent to the whole of the PPG I subfamily.

Species
, using the PPG I classification system, the Checklist of Ferns and Lycophytes of the World accepted the following species and hybrids:

Austroblechnum aequatoriense (A.Rojas) Gasper & V.A.O.Dittrich
Austroblechnum × aggregatum (Colenso) Gasper & V.A.O.Dittrich
Austroblechnum andinum (Baker) Gasper & V.A.O.Dittrich
Austroblechnum ascendens (A.Rojas) Gasper & V.A.O.Dittrich
Austroblechnum asperum (Klotzsch) Gasper & V.A.O.Dittrich
Austroblechnum bakeri (C.Chr.) Gasper & V.A.O.Dittrich
Austroblechnum banksii (Hook.f.) Gasper & V.A.O.Dittrich
Austroblechnum colensoi (Hook.f.) Gasper & V.A.O.Dittrich
Austroblechnum corralense (Espinosa) Gasper & V.A.O.Dittrich
Austroblechnum difforme (Copel.) Gasper & V.A.O.Dittrich
Austroblechnum divergens (Kunze) Gasper & V.A.O.Dittrich
Austroblechnum durum (T.Moore) Gasper & V.A.O.Dittrich
Austroblechnum fernandezianum (Looser) Gasper & V.A.O.Dittrich
Austroblechnum integrifrons (Bonap. ex Rakotondr.) Gasper & V.A.O.Dittrich
Austroblechnum ivohibense (C.Chr.) comb. ined.
Austroblechnum jamaicense (Broadh.) Gasper & V.A.O.Dittrich
Austroblechnum keysseri (Rosenst.) Gasper & V.A.O.Dittrich
Austroblechnum lanceolatum (R.Br.) Gasper & V.A.O.Dittrich
Austroblechnum lechleri (T.Moore) Gasper & V.A.O.Dittrich
Austroblechnum lehmannii (Hieron.) Gasper & V.A.O.Dittrich
Austroblechnum lherminieri (Bory) Gasper & V.A.O.Dittrich
Austroblechnum leyboldtianum (Phil.) Gasper & V.A.O.Dittrich
Austroblechnum melanocaulon (Brack.) Gasper & V.A.O.Dittrich
Austroblechnum membranaceum (Colenso ex Hook.) Gasper & V.A.O.Dittrich
Austroblechnum microphyllum (Goldm.) Gasper & V.A.O.Dittrich
Austroblechnum norfolkianum (Heward) Gasper & V.A.O.Dittrich
Austroblechnum nukuhivense (E.D.Br.) Gasper & V.A.O.Dittrich
Austroblechnum organense (Brade) Gasper & V.A.O.Dittrich
Austroblechnum patersonii (R.Br.) Gasper & V.A.O.Dittrich
Austroblechnum penna-marina (Poir.) Gasper & V.A.O.Dittrich
Austroblechnum pinnatifidum (A.Rojas) Gasper & V.A.O.Dittrich
Austroblechnum raiateense (J.W.Moore) Gasper & V.A.O.Dittrich
Austroblechnum × rodriguezii Aguiar, L.G.Quintan. & Amigo) Gasper & V.A.O.Dittrich
Austroblechnum squamipes (Hieron.) Gasper & V.A.O.Dittrich
Austroblechnum stoloniferum (Mett. ex E.Fourn.) Gasper & V.A.O.Dittrich
Austroblechnum vallegrandense (M.Kessler & A.R.Sm.) Gasper & V.A.O.Dittrich
Austroblechnum vieillardii (Mett.) Gasper & V.A.O.Dittrich
Austroblechnum wardiae (Mickel & Beitel) Gasper & V.A.O.Dittrich

References

Blechnaceae
Fern genera